Albina Shakirova (born 30 March 1987) is a Russian sports shooter. She competed in the women's skeet event at the 2016 Summer Olympics.

References

External links
 

1987 births
Living people
Russian female sport shooters
Olympic shooters of Russia
Shooters at the 2016 Summer Olympics
Place of birth missing (living people)
Universiade medalists in shooting
Universiade bronze medalists for Russia
European Games competitors for Russia
Shooters at the 2015 European Games
Shooters at the 2019 European Games
Medalists at the 2013 Summer Universiade
21st-century Russian women